was a Japanese film director and screenwriter. His work displays a vast range in genre and style, from the anti-war films The Burmese Harp (1956) and Fires on the Plain (1959), to the documentary Tokyo Olympiad (1965), which won two BAFTA Film Awards, and the 19th-century revenge drama An Actor's Revenge (1963). His film Odd Obsession (1959) won the Jury Prize at the 1960 Cannes Film Festival.

Early life and career
Ichikawa was born in Ise, Mie Prefecture as Giichi Ichikawa (市川儀一). His father died when he was four years old, and the family kimono shop went bankrupt, so he went to live with his sister. He was given the name "Kon" by an uncle who thought the characters in the kanji 崑 signified good luck,  because the two halves of the Chinese character look the same when it is split in half vertically. As a child he loved drawing and his ambition was to become an artist. He also loved films and was a fan of "chambara" or samurai films. In his teens he was fascinated by Walt Disney's "Silly Symphonies" and decided to become an animator. He attended a technical school in Osaka. Upon graduation, in 1933, he found a job with a local rental film studio, J.O Studio, in their animation department. Decades later, he told the American writer on Japanese film Donald Richie, "I'm still a cartoonist and I think that the greatest influence on my films (besides Chaplin, particularly The Gold Rush) is probably Disney."

He moved to the feature film department as an assistant director when the company closed its animation department, working under directors including Yutaka Abe and Nobuo Aoyagi.

In the early 1940s J.O Studio merged with P.C.L. and Toho Film Distribution to form the Toho Film Company. Ichikawa moved to Tokyo. His first film was a puppet play short, A Girl at Dojo Temple (Musume Dojoji 1946), which was confiscated by the interim U.S. Occupation authorities under the pretext that it was too "feudal", though some sources suggest the script had not been approved by the occupying authorities. Thought lost for many years, it is now archived at the Cinémathèque Française.

It was at Toho that he met Natto Wada. Wada was a translator for Toho. They agreed to marry sometime after Ichikawa completed his first film as director. Natto Wada's original name was Yumiko Mogi (born 13 September 1920 in Himeji, Hyōgo Prefecture, Japan); the couple both had failed marriages behind them. She graduated with a degree in English literature from Tokyo Woman's Christian University. She married Kon Ichikawa on 10 April 1948, and died on 18 February 1983 of breast cancer.

1950–1965
It was after Ichikawa's marriage to Wada that the two began collaborating, first on Design of a Human Being (Ningen moyo) and Endless Passion (Hateshinaki jonetsu) in 1949. The period 1950–1965 is often referred to as Ichikawa's Natto Wada period. It's the period that contains the majority of Ichikawa's most highly respected works, such as Tokyo Olympiad (Tōkyō Orinpikku), for which he was awarded the Olympic Diploma of Merit, as well as the BAFTA United Nations Award and the Robert Flaherty Award (now known as the BAFTA Award for Best Documentary). It is also during this period that Wada wrote 34 screenplays, most of which were adaptations.

He gained Western recognition during the 1950s and 1960s with two anti-war films, The Burmese Harp and Fires on the Plain, and the technically formidable period-piece An Actor's Revenge (Yukinojo henge) about a kabuki actor.

Among his many literary adaptations were Jun'ichirō Tanizaki's The Key (Kagi), Natsume Sōseki's The Heart (Kokoro) and I Am a Cat (Wagahai wa neko de aru), in which a teacher's cat critiques the foibles of the humans surrounding him, and Yukio Mishima's Conflagration (Enjo), in which a priest burns down his temple to save it from spiritual pollution. The Key, released in the United States as Odd Obsession, was entered in the 1960 Cannes Film Festival, and won the Jury Prize with Antonioni's L'Avventura.

After 1965
After Tokyo Olympiad Wada retired from screenwriting, and it marked a significant change in Ichikawa's films from that point onward. Concerning her retirement, he said "She doesn't like the new film grammar, the method of presentation of the material; she says there's no heart in it anymore, that people no longer take human love seriously."

His final film, 2006's Inugamis, a remake of Ichikawa's own 1976 film The Inugami Family, was entered into the 29th Moscow International Film Festival.

Also in 2006, Ichikawa was the subject of a feature-length documentary, The Kon Ichikawa Story, directed by Shunji Iwai.

Ichikawa died of pneumonia on 13 February 2008 in a Tokyo hospital. He was 92 years old.

The Magic Hour marked Ichikawa's last appearance and was dedicated to his memory. (This message can be seen in the end of this film.) In this film, a movie director played by Ichikawa is shooting Kuroi Hyaku-ichi-nin no Onna (a hundred and one dark women), a parody of Ten Dark Women.

Legacy
Ichikawa's films are marked with a certain darkness and bleakness, punctuated with sparks of humanity.

It can be said that his main trait is technical expertise, irony, detachment and a drive for realism married with a complete spectrum of genres. Some critics class him with Akira Kurosawa, Kenji Mizoguchi and Yasujirō Ozu as one of the masters of Japanese cinema.

The Kon Ichikawa Memorial Room, a small museum dedicated to him and his wife Natto Wada displaying materials from his personal collection, was opened in Shibuya in 2015, on the site of his former home.

Filmography

Yowamushi Chinsengumi (1935)
A Girl at Dojo Temple (1946)
 A Thousand and One Nights with Toho (東宝千一夜 Toho senichi-ya) (1947)
The Lovers (1951)
The Woman Who Touched the Legs (Ashi ni sawatta onna) (1951)
Mr. Pu (1953)
Okuman Chōja (1954)
Ghost Story of Youth (Seishun kaidan) (1955)
The Heart (Kokoro) (1955)
 The Burmese Harp (1956) - black and white version
Punishment Room (1956)
Bridge of Japan (1956)
The Men of Tohoku (1957)
The Hole (1957)
Enjo (1958)
Odd Obsession (1959)
Fires on the Plain (1959)
A Woman's Testament (1960) - together with Kōzaburō Yoshimura and Yasuzo Masumura
Bonchi (1960)
Her Brother (1960)
Ten Dark Women (1961)
The Sin (a.k.a. The Broken Commandments)(1962)
Being Two Isn't Easy (1962)
An Actor's Revenge (1963)
Alone Across the Pacific (1963)
Money Talks (1963)
Tokyo Olympiad (documentary) (1965)
The Tale of Genji (1966)
Topo Gigio and the Missile War (1967)
To Love Again (1971)
Kogarashi Monjirō (1972) TV
Visions of Eight (1973) - documentary; anthology film
The Wanderers (1973)
I Am a Cat (1975)
The Inugami Family (1976)
Rhyme of Vengeance (1978)
Hi no Tori (The Phoenix) (1978)
The Devil's Island (1978)
Byoinzaka no Kubikukuri no Ie (1979)
Koto (a.k.a. Koto, the Ancient City) (1980)
Kofuku (1981)
The Makioka Sisters (a.k.a. Fine Snow, 細雪 Sasame-yuki) (1983)
Ohan (1984)
The Burmese Harp (1985) - color remake
The Adventures of Milo and Otis (1986) - associate director
Princess from the Moon (1987)
Actress (1987)
Crane (Tsuru) (1988)
 (1991)
Kaetekita Kogarashi Monjirō (1993)
47 Ronin (1994)
The 8-Tomb Village (1996)
Shinsengumi (2000)
Dora-heita (2000)
Kah-chan(2001)Yume jûya (2006)
''The Inugamis (2006)

References

External links

 (official site, in Japanese)

Senses of Cinema: Great Directors Critical Database
Strictly Film School: Kon Ichikawa

1915 births
2008 deaths
People from Ise, Mie
Akira Kurosawa Award winners
Deaths from pneumonia in Japan
Japanese film directors
Japanese animated film directors
Anime directors
Samurai film directors
Japanese animators
Persons of Cultural Merit